Mud Creek is a stream in Gasconade and Osage counties of central Missouri. It is a tributary of the Gasconade River.

The stream source lies north of Hope and it flows to the southeast to enter the flood plain and then turns north for about one mile before entering the main channel of the Gasconade.

Mud Creek was named for the muddy character of its water.

See also
List of rivers of Missouri

References

Rivers of Gasconade County, Missouri
Rivers of Osage County, Missouri
Rivers of Missouri
Tributaries of the Gasconade River